On June 27, 2022, 53 migrants were found dead in and around a tractor-trailer near Lackland Air Force Base in San Antonio, Texas, United States. The deaths, caused by heat exposure and asphyxiation, reportedly occurred during an apparent illegal migrant smuggling attempt across the U.S.–Mexico border. It is the deadliest smuggling incident of its kind in United States history.

Background
During 2022, there has been a record number of migrants crossing the U.S.–Mexico border, where authorities are on pace to record more than 2 million arrests. U.S. Customs and Border Protection figures showed that illegal immigration arrests at the border in May rose to the highest levels ever recorded. They made 239,416 arrests along the border in May, a two percent increase from April.

San Antonio is known as a major transit point for migrants moving from Texas to the rest of the United States. Located  from the U.S.–Mexico border, smugglers will transport migrants to the city by means of large vehicles. Earlier in June, the Department of Homeland Security released details on the Biden administration's efforts to combat human smuggling and unauthorized migration in conjunction with the Summit of the Americas held in Los Angeles. The series of operations launched across the Western Hemisphere is part of the largest human smuggling crackdown ever seen in the region, with more than 1,300 deployed personnel and nearly 2,000 smugglers arrested in just two months.

A similar incident occurred in San Antonio on July 23, 2017, when 39 migrants were found in a tractor-trailer in a Walmart parking lot. Ten of them died and 29 were injured. Eight of them died at the scene and two in the hospital. The deaths were found to have been caused by a combination of heat exposure and asphyxiation.

Incident
On June 27, the tractor-trailer was discovered on Quintana Road by workers from a nearby business. The road runs parallel to Interstate 35, one of the major north-south routes in the central United States for traffic and commerce from the Southern border, which is often exploited by smugglers. A survivor of the truck claimed that the migrants had been waiting in a warehouse on the Texas side of the border before their cellphones were confiscated and they were loaded into the truck, which she believed to have chicken bouillon covering the floor. The truck made multiple stops to pick up additional migrants, and conditions in the truck deteriorated with people yelling about the heat and being unable to breathe, with the survivor stating there was minimal water brought by other migrants who crowded near the doors by the end as it was cooler.

San Antonio Police Chief William McManus reported that officers had received a call shortly before 6:00 p.m. after a person working nearby heard a cry for help. When the worker approached he saw several bodies stacked inside the tractor-trailer with the doors partially ajar. San Antonio Fire Department arrived and found many deceased individuals and others too weak to free themselves even with the doors ajar, due to heat stroke and exhaustion from lack of air-conditioning and water in  conditions. The alleged truck driver, Homero Zamorano Jr was apparently unaware that the truck's air conditioning had failed, according to Christian Martinez who had been texting Zamorano details including a manifest for the truck and a location in Laredo, TX, on June 27. 

A responding San Antonio Police officer stated that when they and other first responders arrived they moved many of the victims out of the trailer as they were prioritizing finding those that were still alive. First responders used K-9s to search the area for additional victims that may have attempted to find assistance, although no additional victims were found. Zamorano was seen attempting to flee the area, and followed by a police helicopter before he was later discovered by authorities hiding in a bush near the abandoned truck.

Victims 
Fifty-three people died in the incident with forty-six bodies discovered in the trailer. Three survivors died in the Baptist Health System hospital later that day and another the following day. The deceased were forty men and thirteen women with twenty-seven from Mexico, fourteen from Honduras, seven from Guatemala, and two from El Salvador.

Sixteen injured but conscious survivors, twelve adults and four children, were taken to medical facilities.

Investigation

On June 28, 2022, four individuals, including the alleged driver, were taken into custody. Two have been charged with transportation of illegal immigrants resulting in death, which could result in life in prison or the death penalty. One of them, Christian “Gordo” Martinez, fell and broke his ankle while in lockup. Martinez, who weighs around 670 pounds, requested to be placed in home confinement due to health issues, but a judge denied his request. 

The other two; Juan Francisco D'Luna-Bilbao and Juan Claudio D'Luna-Mendez, have been charged with possession of a weapon by an illegal alien, which could result in up to ten years in prison. Both men are Mexican citizens that illegally overstayed their tourist visas.

The tractor-trailer that was transporting the migrants was originally believed to be from a South Texas trucking company, Betancourt Trucking and Harvesting, but later found by investigators to be a clone of that company’s trucks. It had the same color and identifying numbers from the federal Department of Transportation and Texas DOT as the Betancourt trucks, but did not carry the company's logo as the business do. A diagnostics test of the trucks computer also found it does not belong to Betancourt, according to the Texas Trucking Association.

Aftermath 
The Consul General of the Mexican Consulate of San Antonio stated they had been inundated with concerned phone calls from family members of migrants who were concerned their relatives might be among the victims. All of the consulates from the home countries of the victims worked together to identify the victims and the repatriation of the victims.

A makeshift memorial was created on the road where the truck was discovered, with flowers, Virgen de Guadalupe candles and gallons of water left at the site. Many of those who visited the memorial wore merchandise of the Honduran national soccer team and prayed and showed the memorial to family and friends outside the United States through video calls. Another memorial was created farther down the road a few days after the first, built around pieces of clothing and shoes that were potentially from the migrants.

At least two Texas funeral homes have offered to help repatriate identified bodies back to their home countries in accordance with Texas laws, as at least one did for a similar tragedy in 2003 where nineteen migrants had died in a similar manner.

Reactions
Mexican President Andrés Manuel López Obrador lamented the deaths and said that the Mexican government was ready to assist with US authorities. López Obrador went on to say that the tragedy was caused by "desperation" and "human trafficking". Guatemalan President Alejandro Giammattei also lamented the deaths and asked that punishments for human trafficking be increased and that it be made an extraditable crime. United States President Joe Biden called the incident horrifying and heartbreaking and blamed smugglers who had no regard for others lives which lead to innocent deaths, and promoted the continued anti-smuggling partnership at the borders. 

Texas Governor Greg Abbott and Senator Ted Cruz blamed President Joe Biden, saying that his "open border" policies resulted in this and his "refusal to implement the law ... had deadly consequences". Abbott announced on June 29 that Texas would add truck checkpoints and the Department of Public Safety would create a new strategy where it would target trucks similar to the one used. He also stated Texas was creating two strike teams to detect, deter and apprehend unlawful crossings and be deployed to the border town of Eagle Pass, with additional units created as needed. San Antonio Mayor Ron Nirenberg called the discovery tragic and horrific, and he expressed the hope that those responsible would be prosecuted to the fullest extent of the law. San Antonio Fire Chief Charles Hood spoke of the tragedy and highlighted the impact it had on first responders, stating that, "We're not supposed to open a truck and see stacks of bodies in there ... none of us come to work imagining that."

See also
2021 Imperial County car crash
Burgenland corpses discovery
Chiapas truck crash
Dover lorry deaths
Essex lorry deaths
Migrant deaths along the Mexico–United States border
Mozambique people smuggling disaster
Ranong human-smuggling incident

References

2022 crimes in Texas
2022 disasters in the United States
2022 in international relations
2022 road incidents
2020s road incidents in North America
2022 trailer deaths
June 2022 crimes in the United States
Disasters in Texas
Illegal immigration to the United States
Migrant disasters
Road incidents in the United States
Mexico–United States relations
Biden administration controversies